

Studio albums

EPs
 "The Platypus EP" (2000)
 "I Lost You to the City EP" (2002)
 "Summertime EP" (2003)
 "Rock & Roll Queen EP" (2004)
 "No Heart No Soul EP" (2005)
 "Young for Eternity EP" 
 "At 1am EP" (2005)
 "Milk EP" (2004)
 "Mary EP"
 "Live at Birmingham Academy EP"
 "The Live Videos EP" (iTunes only)
 "Live and Acoustic in Magdeburg EP" (iTunes only, 2007)
 "Live at Abbey Road EP" (2008)
 "Live at iTunes Festival Berlin (iTunes only, 2008)
 "The Brown Couch Sessions Live" (Gonzo live, 2008)
 "We Don't Need Money to Have a Good Time EP" (iTunes only, 2011)
 "It's a Party EP" (iTunes only, 2011)
 "Kiss Kiss Bang Bang EP" (iTunes only, 2015)
 "Acoustic Adventures at Yfe Studios" (2016)

Singles
All singles released in CD and 7" format on the Infectious/City Pavement record labels unless otherwise stated.

Promotional singles

Music videos

Compilation appearances

Notes

References

Discographies of British artists
Pop music discographies